Pierre Cotignon de la Charnaye was a French poet of the first half of the 17th century.

Born in Nivernais at the end of the XVIth, he spent most of his life in his castle of La Charnaye located in the current commune of Argenvières (Cher). He often travelled to Paris though and met Guillaume Colletet, abbot Marolles, as well as many poets and musicians.

When he became a canon in 1630, he repudiated his verses and began to write Les Travaux de Jésus, five thousand alexandrines devoted to Christ's Passion.

Works 
1623: La Muse champêtre, Text online
1625: Le Phylaxandre, novel
1626: L'Ouvrage poétique, reprinted under the title Les Vers du sieur de la Charnaye (1632)
1628: L'Eventail satyrique
1632: Les Bocages, comédie pastorale, Text online (manuscript)
1638: Les Travaux de Jésus  Text online

Bibliography 
 Maurice Mignon. Pierre Cotignon de la Charnaye, poète nivernais du XVII. Nevers, 1912

17th-century French poets
17th-century French male writers
17th-century French dramatists and playwrights
Year of birth missing
Year of death missing